The 1981 Irish Masters was the seventh edition of the professional invitational snooker tournament, which took place from 18 to 21 February 1981. The tournament was played at Goffs in Kill, County Kildare, and featured ten professional players.

Terry Griffiths won the title for the second time, beating Ray Reardon 9–7 in the final.

Main draw

References

1981 in snooker
Irish Masters
1981 in Irish sport
February 1981 sports events in Europe